Notes of Life is a 1996 studio album by the South African jazz trumpeter Hugh Masekela. The album was recorded in Johannesburg, South Africa, and released by the Columbia label. Sony Music re-released the album in 1999 as a CD.

Track listing

References

External links

1996 albums
Hugh Masekela albums
Columbia Records albums